Maana'omba is an island in the Solomon Islands; it is located in Malaita Province.

Islands of the Solomon Islands